Paradrillia sagamiana is a species of sea snail, a marine gastropod mollusk in the family Horaiclavidae

Description

Distribution
This marine species occurs in Sagami Bay, Japan.

References

 Okutani, Takashi. "Report on the archibenthal and abyssal gastropod Mollusca mainly collected from Sagami Bay and adjacent waters by the RV Soyo-Maru during the years 1955-1963." Journal of the Faculty of Science, University of Tokyo 2.15 (1964): 371–447.

External links
  Tucker, J.K. 2004 Catalog of recent and fossil turrids (Mollusca: Gastropoda). Zootaxa 682:1-1295.

sagamiana
Gastropods described in 1964